Iris W. Estabrook is a Democratic former member of the New Hampshire Senate, representing the 21st district from 2002 to 2008. Previously she was a member of the New Hampshire House of Representatives from 1996 through 2002.

External links
The New Hampshire Senate - Senator Iris Estabrook
Project Vote Smart - Senator Iris W. Estabrook (NH) profile
Follow the Money - Iris W Estabrook
2006 2004 2002 2000 1998 campaign contributions
New Hampshire Senate Democratic Caucus - Iris Estabrook profile

New Hampshire state senators
Members of the New Hampshire House of Representatives
1950 births
Living people
Women state legislators in New Hampshire
21st-century American women